Thomas P. Cullen (c. January 1, 1908 – January 24, 1968) was an American lawyer and politician from New York.

Life
He was born January 1, 1908, in Brooklyn, New York City. He attended St. Mary's school, Brooklyn Prep and Georgetown University. He graduated from New York Law School in 1941, was admitted to the bar, and practiced law in New York City. He married Mathilda Dunn, and they had one son: Thomas Patrick Cullen. They lived in Sunnyside, Queens.

Cullen was appointed as an Assistant D.A. of Queens County in 1946, and entered politics as a Democrat. He was a member of the New York State Assembly from 1965 until his death in 1968, sitting in the 175th, 176th and 177th New York State Legislatures.

He died on January 24, 1968, of a heart attack.

References

1900s births
1968 deaths
People from Sunnyside, Queens
Democratic Party members of the New York State Assembly
Georgetown University alumni
New York Law School alumni
20th-century American politicians